is a former professional tennis player from Japan.

Tennis career
Tsujino twice made the second round of the Tokyo Indoor tournament, in 1990 when he defeated Joey Rive and 1993 when he had a win over Patrik Kühnen.

In the 1994 Australian Open, his only Grand Slam appearance, Tsujino lost in the opening round to Brent Larkham. Also that year he was a mixed doubles silver medalist at the Asian Games in Hiroshima, partnering Nana Miyagi.

In 1996 Tsujino and his partner Tommy Shinada won the professional USTA Capital Eye Center Masters Classic men's doubles title at Forest Meadows.

Tsujino played in five Davis Cup ties for Japan between 1992 and 1995. His two wins were both in doubles, with Thomas Shimada, against the Chinese and Filipino pairings.

Personal life
Tsujino is married to Japanese actress and singer Yōko Oginome.

References

1969 births
Living people
Japanese male tennis players
Asian Games medalists in tennis
Tennis players at the 1994 Asian Games
Medalists at the 1994 Asian Games
Asian Games silver medalists for Japan
Asian Games bronze medalists for Japan
Sportspeople from Osaka
20th-century Japanese people